Bridge in Upper Frederick Township may refer to:

 Bridge in Upper Frederick Township (Fagleysville, Pennsylvania)
 Bridge in Upper Frederick Township (Zieglerville, Pennsylvania)